Oregon Ballot Measure 111, the Right to Healthcare Amendment, is an amendment to the Constitution of Oregon that voters passed as part of the 2022 Oregon elections. The amendment states that "It is the obligation of the state to ensure that every resident of Oregon has access to cost-effective, clinically appropriate and affordable health care as a fundamental right." This measure makes Oregon the first state with a constitutional right to healthcare.

The amendment notes that this "must be balanced against the public interest funding public schools and other essential public services", but does not cover how healthcare would be funded.

Endorsements

See also 
 List of Oregon ballot measures
 2022 United States ballot measures

References 

2022 Oregon ballot measures
Healthcare reform in Oregon
Health policy in the United States
Public health in the United States